Lilibet or Lillibet is a feminine given name of English or Welsh origin. It is often a nickname for the given name Elizabeth. It was the childhood nickname of Queen Elizabeth II, who called herself Lilibet when she was a toddler because she had difficulty pronouncing her full name. Her great-granddaughter Princess Lilibet of Sussex was named in her honour. The name has also been spelled Lilybet in some sources.

Usage
Usage of the name increased in the United States following the birth of the Queen’s great-granddaughter in 2021. Fewer than five American girls were given the name in 2020 (but 13 received the variation "Lilibeth"). Twelve American  girls, including Lilibet Mountbatten-Windsor, were given the name in 2021.  Usage of the name has also increased in the United Kingdom. Fewer than three newborn girls were given the name in the United Kingdom in previous years, but the name was used for eight newborn girls in England and Wales in 2021 after the birth of Lilibet Mountbatten-Windsor. However, the name remains rare throughout the English-speaking world.

Notable people
 Elizabeth II (1926–2022), Queen of the United Kingdom and other Commonwealth realms (nicknamed "Lilibet" by family)
 Lilibet Foster (born 1965), American director, producer and writer
 Princess Lilibet of Sussex (born 2021), granddaughter of King Charles III

References

See also
 Lilibet, circus child, a 1960 book by Swedish writer Astrid Lindgren
 Lilibeth, a similar name or nickname